Bahia Watson (born May 15, 1992) is a Canadian actress and playwright, best known for her recurring role as Brianna/Oferic in the television series The Handmaid's Tale.

She grew up in Carman, Manitoba, the daughter of a Canadian father and a Guyanese mother. In addition to The Handmaid's Tale she has had recurring roles as Sakai in The Expanse and May in Star Trek: Discovery; voice roles in Mysticons, Clifford the Big Red Dog, Big Blue, Total DramaRama and My Little Pony: Make Your Mark; and film roles in Foxfire: Confessions of a Girl Gang, What We Have, Cranks and The Archivists.

As a playwright she has been associated with Nightwood Theatre and d'bi Young's anitAFRIKA dub theatre, and has written cabaret stage shows with Liza Paul including pomme is french for apple and Mashup Pon Di Road.

As a cast member in The Handmaid's Tale, she is a two-time Screen Actors' Guild nominee for Outstanding Performance by an Ensemble in a Drama Series, receiving nods at the 25th Screen Actors Guild Awards in 2019 and at the 26th Screen Actors Guild Awards in 2020. She won the award for Outstanding Voice Performance — Female from the Toronto chapter of the ACTRA Awards in 2021 for Total Dramarama.

References

External links

1992 births
Living people
21st-century Canadian actresses
21st-century Canadian dramatists and playwrights
21st-century Canadian women writers
Canadian television actresses
Canadian film actresses
Canadian voice actresses
Canadian stage actresses
Canadian women dramatists and playwrights
Black Canadian writers
Black Canadian actresses
Actresses from Manitoba
Canadian people of Guyanese descent
People from Carman, Manitoba